Wiczlino   is  an estate located in Gdynia, which is part of the Chwarzno Wiczlino district . The boundaries of the Gdynia were remarked by adding the closest villages to make all the built-up area of Gdynia,  in 1973 - the estate itself was  before a village. The estate is made up of  single family houses, surrounded by meadows, fields and woodland. For several years in the Wiczlina estate new  residential houses were built.
 
Currently the name Wiczlino  refers not only to the old centre of the former village but the area around the old village .

References

Gdynia